The acronym SSFA may refer to:

 Singapore Short Film Awards
 South Sudan Football Association
 School Standards and Framework Act 1998, UK
 Sperm-specific antigen 2